The Celebration is a 1998 Danish dark comedy-drama film directed by Thomas Vinterberg and produced by Nimbus Film. The film tells the story of a family gathering to celebrate their father's 60th birthday, juggling subjects of abuse, death, incest, suicide, and trauma. Vinterberg was inspired to write it with Mogens Rukov, based on a hoax broadcast by a Danish radio station.It was the first Dogme 95 film, an artistic movement created by Danish directors Vinterberg and Lars von Trier. The movement preferred simple and analog production values to allow for the highlighting of plot and performance. Festen was selected as the Danish entry for the Best Foreign Language Film at the 71st Academy Awards, but was not accepted as a nominee. In addition, it won the Jury Prize at Cannes Film Festival in 1998.

Plot
Helge (Henning Moritzen), a respected businessman and family patriarch, is celebrating his 60th birthday at the family-run hotel. Gathered together amongst a large party of family and friends are his wife Else (Birthe Neumann), his sullen eldest son Christian (Ulrich Thomsen), his boorish younger son Michael (Thomas Bo Larsen), and his well-traveled daughter Helene (Paprika Steen). Another sibling, Linda, has recently taken her life at the hotel. Helene finds Linda's suicide note, but hides it in a medicine bottle after becoming upset by the undisclosed contents. Michael fights with his wife, whom he had earlier abandoned on the roadside with their three children, and then has sex with her. He later beats Michelle, a waitress of the hotel, after she pulls him aside to discuss that he had impregnated her in an affair.

At Helge's birthday dinner, Christian makes a toast to his father. During the toast, he publicly accuses by making a joke over Helge of sexually abusing both him and his twin sister Linda as children. After an initial shocked silence, the party goes on as usual as guests decide to move past the moment in denial. Helge pulls Christian aside to engage in a baffled conversation about his accusations. He questions his motivations for slandering him, and Christian appears to recant his accusation. However, Christian is spurred to further action by hotel chef Kim (Bjarne Henriksen), a childhood friend who knows about the abuse. Christian then continues his toast by accusing Helge of causing Linda's death through the trauma caused from the abuse. Helge speaks to Christian alone and makes threatening offers to bring up his troubled personal history, including his impotence with women and Christian's perhaps-incestuous relationship with Linda.

Further exacerbating the tensions of the day, Helene's black boyfriend Gbatokai (Gbatokai Dakinah) shows up, causing the racist Michael to lead most of the partygoers in singing the racist Danish song "Jeg har set en rigtig negermand" to offend him. Else later makes a toast where she makes insulting comments towards her children, and accuses Christian of having an overactive imagination. With this, she asks him to apologize for his earlier statements and accusations. Christian then accuses Else of knowing about the abuse yet not intervening. Michael and two other guests eject Christian from the hotel. When Christian walks back in, they beat him and tie him to a tree in the woods outside of the hotel. Christian unties himself and returns. Pia finds Linda's suicide note and gives it to Christian.

Christian gives the note to Helene and she reads it aloud in front of the party guests. In the note, Linda states that she is overwhelmed by trauma from Helge's abuse. Helge admits to his misdeeds and leaves the dining room. Christian has a hallucination of Linda, causing him to faint. As he awakes, he learns from Helene that Michael is missing. Michael, also drunk, calls Helge outside and beats him severely. The following morning, the family and guests eat breakfast when Helge comes in and speaks to the group. He admits to his wrongdoing and declares his love for his children. Michael tells his father to leave the table.

Cast

Style

Festen is best known for being the first Dogme 95 film (its full title in Denmark is Dogme #1 – Festen). Dogme films are governed by a manifesto that insists on specific production and narrative limitations (such as banning any post-production sound editing), in part as a protest against the expensive Hollywood-style film-making. The movie is a low budget film and was shot on a Sony DCR-PC3 Handycam on standard Mini-DV cassettes.

Some years after making the film, Vinterberg talked about its inspiration: a young man told the story on a radio show of the host . Vinterberg was told about it by the friend of a psychiatric nurse who claimed to have treated the young man. He listened to the radio programme and asked the scriptwriter Mogens Rukov to write a screenplay on the events, as if it were the young man's own story. It was later revealed that the story was completely made up by the patient receiving mental care.

Reception

Critical response
Festen has earned positive reviews. Based on 45 reviews collected by the film review aggregator Rotten Tomatoes, 91% of critics gave the film a positive review. On Metacritic the film has a weighted average score of 82 out of 100, based on 7 critics, indicating "universal acclaim". Roger Ebert gave the film three out of four stars, writing that the film: 

Psychologist Richard Gartner, who specializes in counseling men who were sexually abused as children, writes that Festen is a praiseworthy film that accurately depicts the consequences of sexual abuse:

Accolades
Festen won the following awards:
 Amanda Awards, Norway (1998): Best Nordic Feature Film - Thomas Vinterberg
 Belgian Syndicate of Cinema Critics (2000): Grand Prix
 Bodil Awards (1999):
 Best Actor - Ulrich Thomsen
 Best Film - Thomas Vinterberg
 Canberra International Film Festival (1999): Audience Award - Thomas Vinterberg
 Cannes Film Festival (1998): Jury Prize - Thomas Vinterberg (Tied with La Classe de Neige (1998))
 European Film Awards (1998): European Discovery of the Year - Thomas Vinterberg (Tied with Vie rêvée des anges, La (1998))
 Gijón International Film Festival (1998): Best Director - Thomas Vinterberg
 Guldbagge Awards (1999): Best Foreign Film - Thomas Vinterberg
 Independent Spirit Awards (1999): Best Foreign Film - Thomas Vinterberg
 Los Angeles Film Critics Association Awards (1998): Best Foreign Film - Thomas Vinterberg
 Lübeck Nordic Film Days (1998):
 Audience Prize of the "Lübecker Nachrichten" - Thomas Vinterberg
 Baltic Film Prize for a Nordic Feature Film - Thomas Vinterberg
 Prize of the Ecumenical Jury - Thomas Vinterberg
 New York Film Critics Circle Awards (1998): Best Foreign Language Film - Thomas Vinterberg
 Norwegian International Film Festival (1999): Best Foreign Film of the Year - Thomas Vinterberg
 Robert Awards (1999):
 Best Actor - Ulrich Thomsen
 Best Cinematography - Anthony Dod Mantle
 Best Editing - Valdís Óskarsdóttir
 Best Film - Thomas Vinterberg
 Best Screenplay - Thomas Vinterberg, Mogens Rukov
 Best Supporting Actor - Thomas Bo Larsen
 Best Supporting Actress - Birthe Neumann
 Rotterdam International Film Festival (1999): Audience Award - Thomas Vinterberg
 São Paulo International Film Festival (1998): Honorable Mention - Thomas Vinterberg

Stage adaptations

Festen has frequently been adapted for the stage.

The English-language adaptation was written by David Eldridge. It premiered at the Almeida Theatre in 2004 in a production directed by Rufus Norris, before transferring to a successful West End run at the Lyric Theatre, London until April 2005. It commenced a UK tour in February 2006, before transferring to Broadway. Despite its great success in London, it closed after only 49 performances on Broadway, ending on 20 May 2006. It opened in Melbourne, Australia in July 2006 starring Jason Donovan. An Irish production ran in the Gate Theatre, Dublin, from September to November 2006.

In 2006, a Mexican adaptation opened, starring Mexican actor Diego Luna. In September 2007 a Peruvian production opened starring Paul Vega and Hernan Romero under the direction of Chela de Ferrari.

The Company Theatre mounted the Canadian premiere of Festen in November 2008 at the Berkeley Street Theatre in Toronto. This production was directed by Jason Byrne and starred Eric Peterson, Rosemary Dunsmore, Nicholas Campbell, Philip Riccio, Allan Hawco, Tara Rosling, Caroline Cave, Richard Clarkin, Earl Pastko, Milton Barnes, Gray Powell and Alex Paxton-Beesley.

The Shadwell Dramatic Society's production of FESTEN opened at the ADC Theatre, Cambridge on 6 March 2012.

In July 2018 Play Dead Theatre's production of FESTEN opened at the Rippon Lea Estate in Melbourne. It was directed by Jennifer Sarah Dean and starred Adrian Mulvany.

See also
 List of submissions to the 71st Academy Awards for Best Foreign Language Film
 List of Danish submissions for the Academy Award for Best Foreign Language Film

References

External links
 
 
 An interview with the film director Thomas Vinterberg by Jeremy Lehrer from indiewire.com 
 The Celebration: How Long Can This Go On?  an essay by Michael Koresky on The Criterion Collection

1998 comedy-drama films
1998 films
Best Danish Film Bodil Award winners
Best Danish Film Robert Award winners
Best Foreign Film Guldbagge Award winners
Camcorder films
Danish comedy-drama films
Danish Culture Canon
1990s Danish-language films
Dogme 95 films
European Film Awards winners (films)
Films about dysfunctional families
Films directed by Thomas Vinterberg
Films set in country houses
Incest in film
Independent Spirit Award for Best Foreign Film winners
Nimbus Film films